Le Rifain assis (Seated Riffian), December 1912, oil on canvas, is a painting by Henri Matisse in the collection of the Barnes Foundation, in Philadelphia, Pennsylvania.

References

1912 paintings
Collection of the Barnes Foundation
Paintings by Henri Matisse